'Tüvshrüülekh is a sum (district) of Arkhangai Province in central Mongolia.

The Sum  (1200 km2) had 3438  inhabitants in 2009, 1869 of whom lived in the town of Tüvshrüülekh which is the second largest town of the province. The distance to Tsetserleg, the capital of the province, amounts to 44 km to the southeast.

Tuvshruulekh is situated about 10 km to northeast of the Tsenkher hot springs, a popular tourist destination.

The town of Tüvshrüülekh is the seat of various local authorities and schools. There are some shops and a gas station as well.

Karakorum, the former capital of Mongolia, is about 30 km  to the southeast.

References 

Populated places in Mongolia
Districts of Arkhangai Province